Hurricane Edith was the strongest hurricane to form during the 1971 Atlantic hurricane season and formerly the southernmost landfalling Category 5 hurricane on record in the Atlantic until 2007. Edith also stands as one of the only Category 5 Atlantic hurricanes to not have its name retired, next to 1953's Hurricane Carol, 1961's Hurricane Esther, 2005's Hurricane Emily, and 2019's Hurricane Lorenzo. Edith developed from a tropical wave on September 5 and quickly strengthened into a hurricane in the Caribbean Sea. Edith rapidly intensified on September 9 and made landfall on Cape Gracias a Dios as a Category 5 hurricane on the Saffir-Simpson Hurricane Scale. Being a category 5 hurricane, Edith peaked at only 943 mbar (hPa), making Edith the least intense category 5 Atlantic hurricane on record. It quickly lost intensity over Central America and after briefly entering the Gulf of Honduras it crossed the Yucatán Peninsula in Mexico. Edith steadily weakened over land and dissipated over Georgia on September 18.

The hurricane killed two people when it passed near Aruba. Striking northeastern Central America as a Category 5 hurricane, Edith destroyed hundreds of homes and killed at least 35 people. In Texas high tides caused coastal flooding but little damage. Edith caused moderate to heavy damage in portions of Louisiana due to flooding and a tornado outbreak from the storm. One tornado, rated F3 on the Fujita Scale, damaged several homes and injured multiple people in Baton Rouge. The tornado outbreak extended eastward into Florida, of which a few destroyed entire buildings. Damage in the United States totaled US$25 million (1971 dollars$,  in  dollars).

Meteorological history 

A tropical wave moved off the coast of Africa near Dakar on August 31. It moved westward into the Intertropical Convergence Zone, and organized into a tropical disturbance on September 2 with a small, circular area of convection. The system moved to the west, and on September 3, the convection diminished after moving west of 40° W. By the next day, the tropical disturbance was barely discernible from the clouds of the Intertropical Convergence Zone.

The depression moved westward quickly, and moved through the southern Lesser Antilles early on September 6. The southern portion of the circulation passed over northeastern Venezuela, though after entering the Caribbean Sea, another reconnaissance flight was unable to confirm the existence of a low-level circulation. Shortly thereafter, while moving into an area of light wind shear, it was able to organize and strengthen further, and on September 7, the depression strengthened into Tropical Storm Edith near the island of Curaçao. As the storm continued into open waters of the Caribbean, the upper-level low gradually weakened and was replaced with an anticyclone. This allowed the storm to strengthen further, and on September 8, Edith became a hurricane in the south-central Caribbean Sea.

On September 9, the storm rapidly intensified, and within 24 hours, Edith strengthened from a minimal hurricane to a powerful  Category 5 hurricane just off the coast of Nicaragua. The cause for the explosive deepening is unknown, though it is speculated that the transformation in the upper troposphere from an upper-level low to an anticyclone led to a release of baroclinic energy. Reconnaissance aircraft crews in the peak of the storm reported extreme turbulence, causing concern for the safety of the crews. At its peak intensity, the very well-defined "pinhole" eye was only  in diameter. Late on September 9, Hurricane Edith made landfall on northeastern Nicaragua at Cabo Gracias a Dios.

Hurricane Edith rapidly weakened over the mountainous terrain of northeastern Central America, and 18 hours after it made landfall, it emerged into the Gulf of Honduras as an  Category 1 hurricane. Edith weakened further while crossing the Yucatán Peninsula, and emerged into the Gulf of Mexico near Campeche, Mexico late on September 11 as a minimal tropical storm. Edith initially failed to re-intensify as it moved northwestward, despite low amounts of wind shear and warm waters. This was because an anticyclone over the Gulf was closely connected with Hurricane Fern, which developed and moved over the northwestern portion of the Gulf of Mexico. The anticyclone resulted in an easterly upper-level flow across Edith, creating conditions not conducive for intensification. As Fern moved inland over Texas, the flow became more favorable around Edith, and 36 hours after entering the Gulf of Mexico, the storm began to reintensify slightly.

Edith continued moving to the west-northwest, heading towards the coast of Mexico, but early on September 14, the storm stalled while located just off the coast of Tamaulipas. A mid-latitude trough of low pressure approached the storm, and caused Edith to turn to slowly drift towards the northeast. Located only miles from the Mexican coast, Edith again failed to strengthen until September 15, when it accelerated northeastward and regained hurricane status. Edith rapidly weakened over land, degenerating into a tropical storm over Louisiana, and into a tropical depression over Mississippi. It continued to the east-northeast, and dissipated over northwestern Georgia on September 18.

Preparations 
Fourteen hours prior to Edith making landfall in Central America, the National Hurricane Center warned citizens about the extreme danger of the approaching hurricane, and asked them to prepare for hurricane conditions. While the storm was located in the Gulf of Mexico, the National Hurricane Center issued a Hurricane Warning from Cameron to Morgan City, Louisiana eighteen hours before the hurricane made landfall. Edith later struck land in the middle portion of the warning area.

In Belize, officials ordered the mandatory evacuation of low-lying areas, resulting in hundreds of residents leaving to the United States through the international airport. Officials sent police troops to maintain order and prevent looting.

In the Gulf of Mexico, several oil facilities were closed or placed on automatic controls. Drilling rigs as far east as the coastal waters off of Mississippi were prepared to evacuate in the event Edith moved further east than anticipated. Additionally, thousands evacuated coastal areas of Louisiana prior to the arrival of the hurricane. Several shelters opened in coastal cities, and many people prepared for the hurricane by purchasing emergency supplies. Officials closed schools throughout much of southern Louisiana.

Impact

Caribbean 

Edith produced tropical storm force winds in Aruba, and gusts reached . Two fishermen were reported lost at sea and presumed dead as a result of Edith.

Press reports indicated every house in the Cape Gracias area was destroyed or heavily damaged, leaving 7,000 homeless. The meteorological service in British Honduras stated there were 100 fatalities near Cape Gracias, though a later report indicated 35 people died in Nicaragua. There, damage was estimated at over US$380,000 (1971 dollars$,  in  dollars). Three United States Air Force aircraft delivered food, medical supplies, and fuel to the hurricane victims of Nicaragua. In Honduras, the hurricane produced  tides and strong winds, while strong waves destroyed 40 fishing boats as well. While the hurricane reportedly destroyed entire villages, no deaths occurred in Honduras.

Edith produced flooding in a few towns in the southern portion of the country, with some buildings damaged. Heavy damage was reported near Monkey River Town. Impact in Mexico, if any, is unknown.

United States 

The passage of Hurricane Edith resulted in downed trees and power lines, and damage totaling US$180,000 (1971 dollars, $900,000 in 2006 dollars).

Off the coast of Louisiana, the hurricane wrecked three boats, but all the occupants were safely rescued. However, due to the lack of recording instruments near the hurricane's landing point, whether higher winds occurred there is not known, although likely. A strong rainband well ahead of the hurricane, combined with the intrusion of dry air into the hurricane's circulation, produced 16 tornadoes from Louisiana to Alabama. An F3 tornado touched down in the eastern residential suburbs of Baton Rouge, causing heavy property damage totaling $2.5 million (1971 dollars$,  in  dollars) along its intermittent  path. The tornado also injured three people. An F2 tornado in Tangipahoa Parish caused $250,000 in damage (1971 dollars$,  in  dollars) along its  path, while an F1 tornado in St. Martin Parish injured 6 people on its  path. The hurricane caused extensive damage to the sugar cane crop in southwestern Louisiana. About a month after Edith struck the United States, President Richard Nixon declared portions of Louisiana as a disaster area, which allocated relief funds to aid the affected citizens.

Edith spawned four tornadoes in Alabama, three of which were F2 tornadoes. Two touched down in Baldwin County; one destroyed two homes and damaged several others, and the other destroyed two mobile homes, a few barns, and damaged ten houses. Two tornadoes also touched down in Washington County, one of which destroyed several small buildings and downed a few trees. In Florida, Edith produced slightly above-normal tides and light rain. It spawned a tornado in Pensacola, Florida, injuring one person and inflicting $25,000 in damage (1971 dollars, $125,000 in 2006 dollars). Damage throughout the United States totaled $25 million (1971 dollars, $ in  dollars), primarily from crop damage in southwest Louisiana. No deaths were reported in the United States.

See also 

 Other storms of the same name
 List of Category 5 Atlantic hurricanes
 Hurricane Wilma (2005) – The most intense Atlantic hurricane on record that rapidly strengthened to Category 5 intensity in a similar area
 Hurricane Felix (2007) – The southern-most landfall Category 5 hurricane on record, which caused disastrous impacts across Central America
 Hurricane Eta (2020) – A Category 4 hurricane that caused devastating impacts across Central America

References

External links 
 Movie of a reconnaissance flight into Edith
 1971 Monthly Weather Review

Edith
Edith (1971)
Edith (1971)
Edith (1971)
Edith (1971)
Edith
Edith
1971 meteorology
1971 in Mexico
1971 natural disasters in the United States